Nguyễn Phú Quang (13 October 1949 – 8 December 2021), known popularly simply as Phú Quang, was an influential Vietnamese composer, primarily known for his love songs and songs about Hanoi. He also wrote symphonies and concertos, as well as film scores and soundtracks.

Biography
Nguyễn Phú Quang was born on 13 October 1949 in Phú Thọ as his family was evacuating during the First Indochina War. The family returned to Vinh Loc, Phung Xa, Thach That, Hanoi in 1954. In 1985, he moved to Ho Chi Minh City, but frequently returned to Hanoi, which was of great music inspiration. He resided in Hanoi with his family and ran a restaurant.

He had three children. One of his children, Trinh Huong, is an accomplished pianist. Her husband, Bui Cong Duy, is a well-known Vietnamese violinist.

Quang died in Hanoi on 8 December 2021, at the age of 72 due to complications from diabetes.

Works

Music albums
 Về Lại Phố Xưa
 Mười Ba Chuyện Bình Thường
 Dòng Sông Không Trở Lại
 Cho Một Người Tình Xa
 Một Dại Khờ, Một Tôi
 Trong Ánh Chớp Số Phận
 Phố Cũ Của Tôi
 Tôi Muốn Mang Hồ Gươm Đi
 Cha và Con - with pianist Trinh Huong
 The Best of Phu Quang - Gửi một tình yêu

Notable songs
 Hà Nội ngày trở về
 Em ơi Hà Nội phố
 Đâu phải bởi mùa thu
 Khúc mùa thu
 Im lặng đêm Hà Nội
 Mơ về nơi xa lắm
 Có Một Ngày
 Trong Ánh Chớp Số Phận

References

External links
 
 

1949 births
2021 deaths
People from Hanoi
Vietnamese songwriters
Male songwriters
20th-century Vietnamese musicians
20th-century male musicians
21st-century Vietnamese musicians
21st-century male musicians